Lophognathus is a genus of large-bodied agamid lizards, consisting of two species — L. gilberti and L. horneri — both of which are endemic to northern Australia. Along with several other closely related genera (e.g., Amphibolurus, Gowidon, and Tropicagama), these lizards are commonly referred to as "dragons". In Australia, these lizards are also colloquially known as "Ta Ta" lizards, due to their habit of "waving" after running across hot surfaces.

Lophognathus are slender, slightly compressed, semi-arboreal lizards. They occur in a variety of habitats, including sand dunes and arid regions, but frequently near watercourses.

The first description of a species in the genus Lophognathus was by John Edward Gray in 1842. The species he described,  Lophognathus gilberti, was named after English naturalist John Gilbert, the collector of the type specimen.

Species
Three species are currently recognized in this genus:
Lophognathus gilberti Gray, 1842 – Gilbert's lashtail, Gilbert's dragon
Lophognathus horneri Melville, Ritchie, Chapple, Glor, & Schulte, 2018
Lophognathus maculilabris Boulenger, 1883

Two species formerly included in genus Lophognathus have been reclassified, as follows:
Lophognathus temporalis (also known as Amphibolurus temporalis, Gemmatophora temporalis, Gowidon temporalis, Grammatophora temporalis, Physignathus temporalis, Lophognathus labialis, Lophognathus lateralis, and Lophognathus maculilabris) has been reclassified as Tropicagama temporalis
Lophognathus burnsi has been reclassified as Amphibolurus burnsi

References

Lophognathus
Lizard genera
Taxa named by John Edward Gray